Eupithecia aegyptiaca is a moth in the family Geometridae. It is found in Egypt.

References

Moths described in 1910
aegyptiaca
Moths of Africa